Cheshmeh Nezami (also Romanized as Cheshmeh Nez̧āmī; also known as Zargūsh-e Cheshmeh Nez̧āmī) is a village in Cheleh Rural District, in the Central District of Gilan-e Gharb County, Kermanshah Province, Iran. At the 2006 census, its population was 211, in 42 families.

References 

Populated places in Gilan-e Gharb County